
Gmina Rogowo is a rural gmina (administrative district) in Żnin County, Kuyavian-Pomeranian Voivodeship, in north-central Poland.

Villages
Gmina Rogowo contains the villages and settlements of Bielawka, Biskupiec, Bożacin, Budzisław, Cegielnia, Cotoń, Czewujewo, Długi Bród, Gałęzewko, Gałęzewo, Głęboczek, Gołąbki, Gościeszyn, Gościeszynek, Gostomka, Grochowiska Księże, Grochowiska Szlacheckie, Izdebno, Jeziora, Jeziora-Gajówka, Jeziora-Leśniczówka, Kępniak, Łaziska, Lubcz, Lubczynek, Mięcierzyn, Mięcierzyn-Leśniczówka, Niedźwiady, Recz, Rogówko, Rogowo, Rudunek, Ryszewo, Rzym, Sarnówko, Skórki, Szkółki, Ustroń, Wiewiórczyn, Wiktorowo, Wola, Zalesie and Złotniki.

Neighbouring gminas
Gmina Rogowo is bordered by the gminas of Gąsawa, Gniezno, Janowiec Wielkopolski, Mieleszyn, Mogilno, Trzemeszno and Żnin.

References
Polish official population figures 2006

Rogowo
Żnin County